Huffamoose is an American rock band from Philadelphia formed c.1992.

History
Huffamoose formed in Philadelphia, with the original lineup including Craig Elkins (vocals, guitar), Kevin Hanson (guitar, vocals), Jim Stager (bass) and Erik Johnson (drums).  This remained consistent until sometime in 1999, when Erik Johnson quit the band after a tour stop on the Horde Tour. He was replaced by Chuck Treece.

The group is best known for its hit single "Wait", which reached No. 34 on the Billboard Modern Rock charts in 1998.

Huffamoose released their first album in 14 years, …And That’s When the Golf Ball Hit Me in the Head on November 23, 2018. The band returned to their original lineup for the album.

Documentary
The documentary Here Comes Huffamoose follows the band as they made the journey from being the probable "next big thing" to their ultimate demise. It was screened at the Silver Lake Film Festival in 2003. In the March 2004 edition of Premiere, Cameron Crowe named it as one of the best rock movies of all time.

The group reunited for live shows in 2009, and continues to play sporadic shows at local venues in the Philadelphia area.

Pop Culture
The song "Buy You a Ring", from We've Been Had Again, was used in television advertisements for J. C. Penney.

The song “Zero Hours”, appears in season 1 of Alias, episode 5.

Discography
 Huffamoose (1993)
 We've Been Had Again (1997)
 I Wanna Be Your Pants (2000)
 Kneeslappers (2004)
 The Death of Cool (2004)
 …And That’s When the Golf Ball Hit Me in the Head (2018)

References

Musical quartets
Musical groups from Philadelphia
Alternative rock groups from Pennsylvania